Barbara Couper (1903–1992) was a British stage, film and television actress. She made her stage debut in 1925 and played leading roles at Stratford in the 1930s. Her screen work included several films and much television.

Selected filmography
 Heaven Is Round the Corner (1944) – Mrs. Trevor
 The Story of Shirley Yorke (1948) – Muriel Peach
 The Last Days of Dolwyn (1949) – Lady Dolwyn
 Dark Secret (1949) – Mrs. Barrington
 Paul Temple's Triumph (1950) – Mrs. Morgan
 Happy Go Lovely (1951) – Madame Amanda
 The Lady with the Lamp (1951) – Mrs. Nightingale
 The Weak and the Wicked (1954) – Prison Doctor
 Face in the Night (1957) – Mrs. Francis
 The Amorous Adventures of Moll Flanders (1965) – The Mayor's wife
 The Great St Trinian's Train Robbery (1966) – Mabel Radnage
 Goodbye, Mr. Chips (1969) – Mrs. Paunceforth

References

External links
 

1903 births
1992 deaths
English stage actresses
English film actresses
English television actresses
Actresses from London
20th-century British actresses
20th-century English women
20th-century English people
20th-century British businesspeople